Smithville is the second album by American trumpeter Louis Smith recorded in 1958. It was Smith's final album released by Blue Note label.

Reception

The Allmusic review by Stephen Thomas Erlewine awarded the album 4 stars and stated "Stylistically, there are no surprises here -- this is mainstream bop and hard bop,  original and contemporary bop numbers, as well as standards... It's a first-rate hard bop set that deserves wider distribution than it has received".

Track listing
All compositions by Louis Smith except where noted.

 "Smithville" – 11:04
 "Wetu" – 9:00
 "Embraceable You" (George Gershwin, Ira Gershwin) – 7:06
 "There Will Never Be Another You" (Harry Warren, Mack Gordon) – 5:33 
 "Later" – 6:26
 "Au Privave" (Charlie Parker) – 6:31 Bonus track on CD reissue
 "Bakin'" [aka "Tunesmith" – 6:23 Bonus track on CD reissue
 "There Will Never Be Another You" [mono take] (Warren, Gordon) – 5:32

Personnel
Louis Smith – trumpet
Charlie Rouse – tenor saxophone
Sonny Clark – piano
Paul Chambers – bass
Art Taylor – drums

References

Blue Note Records albums
Louis Smith (musician) albums
1958 albums
Albums recorded at Van Gelder Studio